Brooklyn South is an American ensemble police drama television series that aired on CBS for one season from September 22, 1997, to April 27, 1998. It was aired during the 1997–98 television season. The series was co-created by Steven Bochco, Bill Clark, David Milch, and William M. Finkelstein.

The series attempted to create a setting of a gritty, realistic police station similar to NYPD Blue, but focusing on the uniformed police officers rather than the detectives. The pilot was rated TV-MA for violence, and received attention and controversy as the first broadcast television episode to receive the classification, airing the same year the rating system was introduced.

Synopsis
The focus for Brooklyn South was the 74th Precinct in Brooklyn. Francis "Frank" Donovan (Jon Tenney) was the patrol sergeant who presided every day over the morning shift assignments he gave to the uniformed officers. Donovan was an informant for the hated Internal Affairs Bureau (IAB), and secretly reported to Lt. Stan Jonas (James B. Sikking), who, early in the series, transferred from being an IAB officer to the precinct captain after the officious Captain Lou Zerola (Bradford English) transferred to precinct maintenance. It was later revealed in the season that Donovan became an undercover informant 15 years earlier for IAB to protect his father, a retired cop living in Florida, from indictment for corruption.

In the pilot episode, a psychotic gunman went on a shooting rampage outside the police station, killing a number of policemen and innocent bystanders. He was wounded in the shootout and brought back into the station where he died from his gunshot wounds. It was later revealed that Ann-Marie Kersey (Yancy Butler), a policewoman whose boyfriend was one of the victims of the shooting spree, slipped into the room where the wounded madman was being held and kicked him several times in his chest which caused his death. Because the shooter was black and all of his victims were white, the killer's family pressured the city to launch an Internal Affairs investigation. Eventually, everyone was exonerated for the suspect's death, and Kersey completely got away with it, though her guilt over murdering a critically wounded criminal would haunt her off-and-on for the duration of the series. Kersey then had a romantic affair with Donovan, but it did not last.  Kersey and Donovan later got back together. Later in the series, Kersey was designated to detective.

Also in the pilot episode, Phil Roussakoff (Michael DeLuise), a burly officer, transferred to the 74th Precinct and was partnered with Jimmy Doyle (Dylan Walsh), a well liked and respected street cop whose younger brother, Terry (Patrick McGaw), was trying to become a police officer to follow in their late father's footsteps. Terry left the police academy to take an undercover assignment to infiltrate an Irish street gang planning a bank robbery. Roussakoff briefly dated Jimmy and Terry's younger sister, Kathleen (A. J. Langer), but was awkward and uncomfortable to dating. Terry helped foil the Irish gang's robbery, and he ended up joining the police vice squad anti-crime unit.

Jack Lowery (Titus Welliver) was a tough street cop coping with personal demons which included his selfish and nagging wife, Yvonne, who died early in the season. Lowery later started an affair with his female partner, Nona Valentine (Klea Scott), which did not sit well with Clement Johnson (Richard T. Jones), Nona's former boyfriend and the station's traffic cop. Eventually Nona and Clem got back together, then broke up, and by the series end, Nona got back together again with Lowery. Hector Villaneuva (Adam Rodriguez) was a young rookie cop who was tutored by the rest of the officers how to do his job the best be could.

Richard Santoro (Gary Basaraba) was the station's desk sergeant, a police veteran who had seen it all and was the voice of reason in the station house, keeping things calm. Santoro later stuck up for Donovan when he came out as an informant for Internal Affairs Bureau to save Santoro from a corrupt IAB officer who was trying to ruin Santoro's reputation. Ray MacElwaine (John Finn) was a 50-year-old veteran police officer who transferred to the 74th Precinct late in the series and soon proved himself to everyone that despite his age, he could still "walk the beat" and take down criminals. MacElwaine also stuck up for Donovan after finding out Donovan's work with IAB. In the series final episode, MacElwaine decided to retire from the police force, and Santoro was promoted to Lieutenant. So, Captain Jonas threw a double-party for the entire police station in celebrating Santoro's promotion and MacElwaine's retirement. In his speech, MacElwaine changes his mind and decides not to retire, to great celebration.

Other secondary characters included Kevin Patrick (Mark Kiely), a police officer wounded in the opening shooting spree in the pilot episode, which made him a paraplegic, and his wife Noreen (Star Jasper), both of whom were friends with Jimmy, Terry, and the Doyle family. Also, Emily Flannagan (Brigid Brannagh) was a local barmaid and the daughter of Irish mobster Paddy Flannagan who was the leader of the small Irish gang that Terry had infiltrated. After Terry's undercover work was done, he and Emily got romantically together, but the series ended before their romance could go any further.

Cancellation
The series was scheduled opposite ABC's Monday Night Football and NBC's Dateline Monday, and struggled in the ratings, averaging 10.5 million viewers and ranking 74th for the season. The series underwent retooling in an attempt to boost ratings, but despite the changes, the series was canceled in May 1998 shortly after the first season wrapped. In his autobiography, Steven Bochco says personal issues kept him from inputting as much as usual into this show's production, and that this contributed to weak scripts after the first few episodes. He then took more control in the later episodes and ratings started to perk up, but CBS chairman Les Moonves cancelled the show anyway, a decision Bochco adamantly disagreed with, and a season after extreme tinkering by CBS canceled his comedy Public Morals after one episode.

Cast

Main
 Jon Tenney as Patrol Sgt. Francis 'Frank' Xavier Donovan 
 Michael DeLuise as Officer Phil Roussakoff
 Dylan Walsh as Officer Jimmy Doyle 
 James B. Sikking as Lt./Capt. Stan Jonas
 Yancy Butler as Officer/Detective Anne-Marie Kersey
 Gary Basaraba as Sgt./Lt. Richard 'Dicky' Santoro
 Titus Welliver as Officer Jack Lowery 
 Klea Scott as Officer Nona Valentine
 Richard T. Jones as Officer Clement 'Clem' Johnson
 Adam Rodriguez as Officer Hector Villaneuva 
 Patrick McGaw as Terry Doyle

Recurring
 A. J. Langer as Kathleen Doyle
 Mark Kiely as Officer Kevin Patrick
 Star Jasper as Noreen Patrick
 Brigid Brannagh as Emmeline 'Emily' Flannagan
 Bradford English as Capt. Lou Zerola (1997)
 John Finn as Officer Ray MacElwaine (1998)

Crew
The series was created by Steven Bochco, Bill Clark, William M. Finkelstein and David Milch. Bochco and Milch had worked together on the previous police drama series Hill Street Blues and NYPD Blue. Bochco and Finkelstein worked together on both L.A. Law and Cop Rock. Clark served as a supervising producer, writer and technical advisor on NYPD Blue and is a retired police officer. Bochco, Clark and Milch served as executive producers for the series alongside writer Michael S. Chernuchin and director Michael Watkins. Chernuchin had previously worked as a producer and writer on Law & Order. Watkins had worked with Bochco as a director for NYPD Blue. Clark worked as a supervising producer and regular writer for Brooklyn South. Marc Buckland was the series other supervising producer and a regular director.

Retired Chicago police officer Edward Allen Bernero was a regular writer for the series. Scott Williams and Matt Olmstead were the series other regular writers. During the 1997–1998 television season, Bochco premiered another new series titled Total Security, which was canceled prior to the mid-season break. Writers Doug Palau and Nicholas Wootton moved from Total Security to Brooklyn South in January 1998 and were regular writers for the seasons second half.

Episodes

Home release
On October 28, 2003, A&E Home Video released the complete series on DVD in Region 1.  This release has been discontinued and is now out of print.

On January 25, 2017, CBS DVD re-released Brooklyn South: The Complete Series on DVD in Region 1 via Amazon.com's CreateSpace program. This is a Manufacture-on-Demand (MOD) release, available exclusively through Amazon.com.

Awards and nominations

References

External links 
 
 Remembering Brooklyn South - Formerly titled "Save Brooklyn South," this page originated as part of an unsuccessful Internet campaign to keep the show on the air.

1997 American television series debuts
1998 American television series endings
CBS original programming
1990s American crime drama television series
1990s American police procedural television series
English-language television shows
Fictional portrayals of the New York City Police Department
Primetime Emmy Award-winning television series
Television series by CBS Studios
Television shows set in Brooklyn
Television series created by David Milch
Television series created by Steven Bochco